Ajay Sadhotra (born 29 December 1955) is a senior Indian politician from Jammu and Kashmir. He belongs to the National Conference, a party formed by veteran leader Sheikh Abdullah.

He was a General Secretary at Youth National Conference, Vice-President, Jammu & Kashmir National Conference, Jammu Province.
 
In 1996 and 2002, he was elected as a Member of Legislative Assembly, Marh. From 1996 to 2002, he served as a Minister of Agriculture, CAPD, Transport, Rural Development & Panchayati Raj.
 
He was a Deputy Leader Jammu & Kashmir National Conference, Legislative Party in J&K Legislative Assembly.
 
From 2003 to 2009, he served as a Provincial President, Jammu & Kashmir National Conference, Jammu. Since 2009 - Member of Legislative Council. 
 
He has attended the Food Ministers conference, chaired by Honorable Prime Minister Shri Atal Bihari Vajpayee, and the Panchayati Raj conference, chaired by Honorable Prime minister.

References

"Leader of House". Jammu and Kashmir Legislative Council.

1955 births
Jammu & Kashmir National Conference politicians
Living people
Members of the Jammu and Kashmir Legislative Council
Jammu and Kashmir MLAs 1996–2002
Jammu and Kashmir MLAs 2002–2008